This is a list of winners and nominees of the Primetime Emmy Award for Outstanding Picture Editing for a Comedy Series. This award and Outstanding Single-Camera Picture Editing for a Drama Series replaced Outstanding Single-Camera Picture Editing for a Series in 2003. In 2023, this award and Outstanding Multi-Camera Picture Editing for a Comedy Series will be combined in a renamed category, Outstanding Picture Editing for a Comedy Series.

As of 2015, no show has won this award more than once except for The Office, which has won twice (2007 and 2013).

In the following list, the first titles listed in gold and bold are the winners; those not in gold are nominees, which are listed in alphabetical order. The years given are those in which the ceremonies took place:

Winners and nominations

1970s
Outstanding Film Editing for a Series

Outstanding Film Editing for a Single Episode of a Comedy Series

Outstanding Film Editing for a Series

1980s

2000s
Outstanding Picture Editing for a Comedy Series (Single or Multi-Camera)

2010s

Outstanding Single-Camera Picture Editing for a Comedy Series

2020s

Outstanding Picture Editing for a Comedy Series

Editors with multiple awards

3 awards
 M. Pam Blumenthal 

2 awards
 Andrew Chulack 
 Gene Fowler
 Marjorie Fowler
 Douglas Hines
 David Rogers

Programs with multiple awards

3 wins
 Taxi

2 wins
 The Mary Tyler Moore Show
 The Office

Editors with multiple nominations

9 nominations 
 Steve Rasch 

8 nominations
 Fred W. Berger

6 nominations
 Stanford Tischler 

5 nominations
 Ryan Case
 Ken Eluto 
 Douglas Hines 
 Larry L. Mills
 David Rogers

4 nominations
 M. Pam Blumenthal 
 Ray Daniels
 Dean Holland

3 nominations
 Stuart Bass
 Michael Berenbaum
 Andrew Chulack 
 Jon Corn
 Brian Merken
 Kyle Reiter 
 Meg Reticker
 Tim Roche
 Bill Turro

2 nominations
 Kabir Akhtar
 Jeanene Ambler 
 Samuel E. Beetley
 Jessica Brunetto 
 Jeff Buchanan 
 A.J. Catoline 
 Nina Erb
 Susan Federman
 Gene Fowler
 Marjorie Fowler
 James Galloway 
 David Helfand
 Arthur David Hilton 
 Lance Luckey
 Melissa McCoy 
 Roger Nygard 
 Kate Sanford 
 Claire Scanlon
 Jonathan Schwartz
 Wendey Stanzler
 Tim Streeto
 Laura Weinberg
 J. Terry Williams

Programs with multiple nominations

10 nominations
 Curb Your Enthusiasm
 M*A*S*H

8 nominations
 Modern Family
 The Office

7 nominations
 30 Rock

6 nominations
 Arrested Development
 Silicon Valley

5 nominations
 Barry
 The Mary Tyler Moore Show

4 nominations
 Hacks
 The Marvelous Mrs. Maisel
 Ted Lasso
 Veep
 Weeds

3 nominations
 Desperate Housewives
 My Name Is Earl
 Orange Is the New Black
 Sex and the City
 Taxi

2 nominations
 Atlanta
 Cheers
 How I Met Your Mother
 Insecure
 Only Murders in the Building
 Schitt's Creek

References

Picture Editing for a Comedy Series